Jacques Francis (c. 1527-after February 1548) was an African salvage diver who led the expedition to salvage King Henry VIII's guns from the Mary Rose. He was the first African to give evidence in 1548 before a court. He was accused of being a 'slave' and an 'infidel' in an attempt to discredit his evidence, but he was paid wages so he was not a slave and furthermore, slaves were not allowed to give evidence in court.

Biography
Francis was born around 1527 and was known to be of African descent. It is believed he was from Arguin Island, Mauretania. However, records at the time described him as a "Guinea diver" and exceptionally talented. He had been working for Piero Corsi, who was leading a 1546 salvage attempt of the Mary Rose, following a previous unsuccessful attempt to raise the ship.

Francis and his team were also tasked with salvaging valuables from the Sancta Maria and Sanctus Edwardus merchant ships which sank off the coast of Southampton. During this expedition, Corsi was accused by Domenico Erizzo of theft.

As Francis was lead diver in the expedition, he was an important witness in the matter of the theft, however his race and status led to controversy on whether or not he could be called as a witness. In February 1548 he became the first known African to speak in an English court. Francis described himself as Corsi's "famulus" (assistant) rather than a slave. It is unknown what happened to Francis after February 1548 and his date of death is unknown.

Despite being the first African person to be recorded in court, his legal recognition during the trial did not set a precedent towards the legal status of black individuals in the future.

References

External links
Transcripts of Francis' appearance in court - 

1528 births
Year of death missing
16th-century African people
16th-century English people
16th-century slaves
Slavery in the United Kingdom